Do Gacheh is a village in Abolfares Rural District, in the Central District of Ramhormoz County, Khuzestan Province, Iran. At the 2006 census, its population was 28, in 9 families.

References 

Populated places in Ramhormoz County